The 2002–03 NCAA Division I men's basketball season began on November 10, 2002, progressed through the regular season and conference tournaments, and concluded with the 2003 NCAA Men's Division I Basketball Tournament Championship Game on April 7, 2003 at the Louisiana Superdome in New Orleans, Louisiana. The Syracuse Orange and coach Jim Boeheim won their first NCAA national championship with an 81–78 victory over the Kansas Jayhawks.

Season headlines 
 The preseason AP All-American team was named on November 12. David West of Xavier was the leading vote-getter (43 of 72 votes). The rest of the team included Luke Walton (42 votes) and Jason Gardner (39) of Arizona, Kirk Hinrich of Kansas (35) and Erwin Dudley of Alabama (32).

Major rule changes 
Beginning in 2002–03, the following rules changes were implemented:
 Two free-throw lane spaces closest to the free-thrower would remain unoccupied.
 No free throws were awarded to the offended team in bonus for personal fouls committed by a team while in team control or in possession of the ball during a throw-in (team-control foul).

Season outlook

Pre-season polls 
The top 25 from the AP and ESPN/USA Today Coaches Polls November 13, 2002.

Conference membership changes 

These schools joined new conferences for the 2002–03 season.

Regular season

Conference winners and tournaments

Statistical leaders

Postseason tournaments

NCAA tournament

Final Four – Louisiana Superdome, New Orleans, Louisiana

National Invitation tournament

Semifinals & finals 

 Third Place – Texas Tech 71, Minnesota 61

Award winners

Consensus All-American teams

Major player of the year awards 
 Wooden Award: T. J. Ford, Texas
 Naismith Award: T. J. Ford, Texas
 Associated Press Player of the Year: David West, Xavier
 NABC Player of the Year: Nick Collison, Kansas
 Oscar Robertson Trophy (USBWA): David West, Xavier
 Adolph Rupp Trophy: David West, Xavier
 Sporting News Player of the Year: T. J. Ford, Texas

Major freshman of the year awards 
 USBWA Freshman of the Year: Carmelo Anthony, Syracuse
 Sporting News Freshman of the Year: Carmelo Anthony, Syracuse

Major coach of the year awards 
 Associated Press Coach of the Year: Tubby Smith, Kentucky
 Henry Iba Award (USBWA): Tubby Smith, Kentucky
 NABC Coach of the Year: Tubby Smith, Kentucky
 Naismith College Coach of the Year: Tubby Smith, Kentucky
 CBS/Chevrolet Coach of the Year: Tubby Smith, Kentucky
 Sporting News Coach of the Year: Tubby Smith, Kentucky

Other major awards 
 Pete Newell Big Man Award (Best big man): David West, Xavier
 NABC Defensive Player of the Year: Emeka Okafor, Connecticut
 Frances Pomeroy Naismith Award (Best player under 6'0): Jason Gardner, Arizona
 Lowe's Senior CLASS Award (top senior): David West, Xavier
 Robert V. Geasey Trophy (Top player in Philadelphia Big 5): Jameer Nelson, St. Joseph's
 NIT/Haggerty Award (Top player in New York City metro area): Luis Flores, Manhattan
 Chip Hilton Player of the Year Award (Strong personal character): Brandon Miller, Butler

Coaching changes 
A number of teams changed coaches throughout the season and after the season ended.

References